Lenger (Leñgır, لەنگەر) is a city in Tole Bi District, Turkistan Region of Kazakhstan. As of 2012 Lenger had a population of 25,298. Lenger is the administrative center of the Tole Bi District. The Museum of the Tole Bi District (Музей Толебийского района) is in Lenger. Population:  

There is a lot of dispute what the word Lenger means, as all the city names in Kazakh language has a meaning, there is no clear information about the origin (etimology) of Lenger.

Notable people
 Robert S. Wistrich, renowned scholar of antisemitism

In popular culture
In Command & Conquer: Generals, Lenger serves as a traitorous GLA warlord's base serving Chinese "masters". GLA forces loyal to the Commander were commanded to destroy both traitors and repulse any Chinese allies' attempts to relief the attack.

References 
https://web.archive.org/web/20121219231835/http://en.ontustik.gov.kz/gw/goroda_raion

Populated places in Turkistan Region